The Portrait of a Nun is a painting from the 1610s, attributed to the Italian artist Artemisia Gentileschi. It is currently in a private collection

References 

1610s paintings
Paintings by Artemisia Gentileschi
Portraits by Italian artists